A number of terrorist incidents attacks occurred in 2021 in Iraq.

Timeline of attacks

References